The 51st edition of the annual Four Hills Tournament was held in the traditional venues: Oberstorf and Garmisch-Partenkirchen in Germany, and Innsbruck and Bischofshofen in Austria. The defending champion was Sven Hannawald. After being the first ski jumper to win on all four hills in the previous year, he also won the first event of 2003-04. This fifth consecutive victory at a Four Hills tournament equalized a record set by Helmut Recknagel in the late 1950s. Kamil Stoch achieved the same feat in 2018.

The tournament victor was Janne Ahonen, who had already won the tournament four years prior, and would continue to win it three more times, becoming the most successful athlete of the Four Hills tournament.

Format

At each of the four events, a qualification round was held. The 50 best jumpers qualified for the competition. The fifteen athletes leading the World Cup at the time qualified automatically. In case of an omitted qualification or a result that would normally result in elimination, they would instead qualify as 50th.

Unlike the procedure at normal World Cup events, the 50 qualified athletes were paired up for the first round of the final event, with the winner proceeding to the second round. The rounds start with the duel between #26 and #25 from the qualification round, followed by #27 vs #24, up to #50 vs #1. The five best duel losers, so-called 'Lucky Losers' also proceed.

For the tournament ranking, the total points earned from each jump are added together. The World Cup points collected during the four events are disregarded in this ranking.

Pre-Tournament World Cup Standings

At the time of the tournament, eight out of twenty-eight events were already held.

The standings were as follows:

Participating nations and athletes

The number of jumpers a nation was allowed to nominate was dependent on previous results. At each event, a 'national group' of ten jumpers from the host country was added.

The defending champion was Sven Hannawald. Six other competitors had also previously won the Four Hills tournament: Andreas Goldberger in 1992-93 and 1994–95, Primož Peterka in 1996-97, Kazuyoshi Funaki in 1997-98, Janne Ahonen in 1998-99, Andreas Widhölzl in 1999-00 and Adam Małysz in 2000-01.

The following athletes were nominated:

Results

Oberstorf
 Schattenbergschanze, Oberstorf
28-29 December 2002

Qualification winner:  Roar Ljøkelsøy

Garmisch-Partenkirchen
 Große Olympiaschanze, Garmisch-Partenkirchen
31 December 2002 - 1 January 2003

The second event saw three former tournament winners on the podium, two of which have not even placed in the Top Ten in Oberstorf. The first event's winner Sven Hannawald on the other hand, only placed 12th (235.1p).

Qualification winner:  Thomas Morgenstern

Innsbruck
 Bergiselschanze, Innsbruck
03-4 January 2003

The jumbled results of the first two events saw Janne Ahonen in the lead after the tournament's first half. With a clear victory in Innsbruck, the Finn increased his lead in the overall ranking to 26.7 points.

Again, the winner of the previous event could not be found in the Top Ten. Peterka placed 15th (198.1p).

Qualification winner:  Stefan Thurnbichler

Bischofshofen
 Paul-Ausserleitner-Schanze, Bischofshofen
6 January 2003

Due to bad weather, the qualification was postponed to January 6, and instead of Sudden Death match-ups in the first round, the usual World Cup format was used.

The surprise winner was 21-year-old Bjørn Einar Romøren, whose best position during the tournament so far had been a 15th place in Garmisch-Partenkirchen. It was his first World Cup victory.

Janne Ahonen performed two solid jumps and his comfortable lead in the overall ranking was not in danger.

Qualification winner:  Thomas Morgenstern

Final ranking

The winner of Bischofshofen, Bjørn Einar Romøren, had failed to proceed to the second round of Oberstorf and only placed 19th overall (801.4p).

References

External links
 FIS website
 Four Hills Tournament web site

 
Fis Ski Jumping World Cup, 2002-03
Fis Ski Jumping World Cup, 2002-03